Howard Township is a township in Story County, Iowa, USA.  As of the 2000 census, its population was 1945.

Geography
According to the USGS, it contains four cemeteries: Sheffield Cemetery, Fosen Cemetery, Roland Cemetery and Peerson Cemetery.

Howard Township contains Long Dick Creek.

 Interstate 35 runs north and south through the township and County Road E18 runs east–west.  County Road E18 was formerly Iowa Hwy 221 until it was decommissioned on July 1, 2003, and redesignated as a county road.

Notes

References
 USGS Geographic Names Information System (GNIS)

External links
 US-Counties.com
 City-Data.com

Townships in Story County, Iowa
Townships in Iowa